The Komodo Dragon is reportedly one of the hottest chili peppers in the world, at around 1.4 million Scoville heat units.

The pepper was announced in 2015, and went on sale in Tesco stores. The pepper is notable also for what was described as a "delayed reaction"—Eleanor Mansell, who buys chili peppers for Tesco, said, "At first you can taste a wonderful hot fruitiness, but then after about 10 seconds the full might of this little demon hits you and your whole mouth is aglow". According to a Tesco buyer, the Komodo Dragon became their most popular pepper in 2015, and it was brought back for 2016.

See also
 Race to grow the hottest pepper
 Komodo Dragon

References

Chili peppers